Silver-spotted skipper is the common English name given to three species of butterfly:

 In Europe, Hesperia comma
 In North America, Epargyreus clarus
 In Australia, Trapezites argenteoornatus

Animal common name disambiguation pages